Tonya Kay is an American film actress, television personality, and burlesque performer who is the creator and producer of Tonya Kay's Pinup Pole Show.

Early life
Tonya Kay was born in southern Michigan. She graduated as valedictorian of her high school class. Kay is a practicing raw vegan, pagan and Chaote.

Career

Early career
Kay began tap dance training at age four. At age six, she performed in a local community theatre production of the musical Oliver!. At 15, she was cast in her first professional production, The Music Man at Detroit, Michigan's Fisher Theatre. She spent four years performing in Chicago theatres, including the Drury Lane Theatre, Peninsula Players, Theatre at the Centre, Theatre Building Chicago and Apollo Theater Chicago. In New York City, she performed concert dance and experimental theatre, including De La Guarda, and eventually toured in Stomp.

Television and film
Her guest appearances on American network television programs include Jane the Virgin, Criminal Minds, House M.D., Glee, The Fosters, and Rosewood. Her movie credits include Bastard (20th Century Fox), The Other Wife, Web Cam Girls & Saving My Baby (LMN), and an upcoming release on SyFy, Earthtastrophe.

Business ventures
Tonya Kay is a devoted environmentalist and has held the CEO position of two carbon-neutral film and television industry service companies: Solid Hollywood LLC and Happy Mandible, Inc.

Filmography

Film

Television

References

External links
 
 Official Tonya Kay Website 

Living people
American film actresses
American television actresses
21st-century American women
1981 births